Dinalbuphine sebacate (DNS), also known as nalbuphine sebacate or as sebacoyl dinalbuphine ester (SDE) and sold under the brand name Naldebain, is a non-controlled opioid analgesic which is used as a 7-day long-acting injection in the treatment of moderate to severe postoperative pain.

The compound is a diester of nalbuphine (Nubain) joined via a sebacic acid linker, and acts as a long-lasting prodrug of nalbuphine via slow hydrolysis. It was developed to extend the duration of action of nalbuphine, which has a short duration and requires frequent injections. Whereas nalbuphine must be injected every 4 to 6 hours, a single injection of DNS lasts for up to 7 to 10 days.

It was invented by professor Oliver Yoa-Pu Hu (National Defense Medical Center) and codeveloped with Lumosa Therapeutics. Naldebain received market approvals from Taiwan FDA in March 2017, Health Sciences Authority of Singapore in December 2020, the Ministry of Public Health of Thailand in December 2021, and the Drug Control Authority of Malaysia in 2022. Development is ongoing in the United States, China, Korea, Ukraine, the Philippines, and Brunei.

Medical uses 
Naldebain is indicated for the relief of moderate to severe acute postsurgical pain, administered intramuscularly. The product is available in single-use vials; 2 mL single use vial (75 mg/mL) for IM injection is packaged in a carton.

Pharmacology

Pharmacodynamics
Nalbuphine, and hence DNS, acts as a mixed agonist/antagonist opioid modulator, or more specifically as a moderate-efficacy partial agonist or antagonist of the μ-opioid receptor and as a high-efficacy partial agonist of the κ-opioid receptor.

Pharmacokinetics
The release mechanism of dinalbuphine sebacate (DNS) upon IM injection is as follows:

 The injected Naldebain is first forming an oil depot in the muscle
 The oil depot gradually dispersed to small droplets in the surrounding tissues
 The prodrug DNS diffused out from the surface of oil droplets, and once released, a small portion of the prodrug get hydrolyzed by esterases to release the active ingredient, nalbuphine, in the surrounding tissue cells, while the majority of the prodrug would enter the blood stream through local tissue drainage (e.g., lymph flow) and get hydrolyzed to nalbuphine in the blood.

References

External links
 Dinalbuphine sebacate - AdisInsight
Naldebain information - Lumosa Therapeutics website

Analgesics
Cyclobutyl compounds
4,5-Epoxymorphinans
Ethers
Kappa-opioid receptor agonists
Mu-opioid receptor agonists
Mu-opioid receptor antagonists
Phenols
Semisynthetic opioids
Tertiary alcohols